The East Delaware Tunnel is a  aqueduct in the New York City water supply system.  Located in the 
Catskill Mountains of New York State, it was constructed within a six-year period between 1949 and 1955 to transport drinking water from the Pepacton Reservoir to the Rondout Reservoir. The tunnel begins near the former site of Pepacton, New York, and ends near the former site of Eureka, New York, passing through Delaware County, Sullivan County and Ulster County.

See also

 List of reservoirs and dams in New York

References

External links
  at Pepacton Reservoir inlet
  at Rondout Reservoir outlet

Catskill/Delaware watersheds
Transportation buildings and structures in Delaware County, New York
Transportation buildings and structures in Ulster County, New York
Transportation buildings and structures in Sullivan County, New York
Tunnels in New York (state)
Water tunnels in the United States